The Eastern Local School District is a public school district based in the community of Reedsville, Ohio, United States.

The school district includes all of Orange and Olive townships as well as most of Chester Township, the northern portion of Lebanon Township, and a very small portion of far eastern Bedford Township.

Eastern Local Schools serve several unincorporated communities in northeastern Meigs County, including Reedsville, Chester, Long Bottom, and Tuppers Plains.

Schools
Eastern High School  (Grades 9-12)
Eastern Elementary School (Grades K-8)

See also
List of school districts in Ohio

External links
Eastern Local School District – Official site.

School districts in Ohio
Education in Meigs County, Ohio